Morgan Naudé (born 11 August 1998) is a South African rugby union player for the  in the Currie Cup and the Rugby Challenge. His regular position is prop.

References

South African rugby union players
Living people
1998 births
Rugby union props
Pumas (Currie Cup) players
Lions (United Rugby Championship) players
Golden Lions players